Greensboro College is a private college in Greensboro, North Carolina.  It is affiliated with the United Methodist Church and was founded in 1838 by Rev. Peter Doub. The college enrolls about 1,000 students from 32 states, the District of Columbia, and 29 countries.

History

The first college to open its doors within the town of Greensboro was the woman's college, Greensboro Female College. The school occupied a  campus near the heart of the city within what would become the College Hill Historic District. The institution had its origin in 1833, when the Greensboro Female College was organized as an institution for local children. It was the intent of the Rev. Peter Doub that the institution grow to serve women.

Through the Methodist Church, a charter was secured in 1838, an event which makes the college one of the oldest institutions of higher education for women in the United States. The cornerstone of the first building was laid in 1843, and in 1846 the institution opened its doors to students. Young women came from many southern states to become the first classes of the new president, the Rev. Solomon Lea, and his faculty.

In 1912, the school changed its name for the first time, becoming the Greensboro College for Women. The following year, the newly-renamed college granted its first bachelors degrees. 

Not long after, in 1919, the school shortened its title to its current moniker, Greensboro College. The college would not become coeducational, however, until 1954. In 1968, Greensboro formed a consortium of local colleges—the Greensboro Tri-College Consortium—with Guilford College and Bennett College. Other later partnerships would be added with Elon College and Salem College.

Campus

Located in the College Hill Historic District of Greensboro, North Carolina, the college's properties include several buildings of interest. Most are red-brick buildings built in a neoclassical revival or colonial styles. However, the most historic buildings are located around the campus quadrangle.

The oldest building and the administrative center of Greensboro College is the Main Building, housing the offices of the president, senior administrative officers, and important departments. The building also hosts the Brock Historical Museum, which displays artifacts relating to the history of the college as well as its relationship with the United Methodist Church.

The Finch Memorial Chapel was built in 1954 and is the worshiping heart of the college community. It is named after Hannah Brown Finch, an 1885 graduate and wife of Thomas J. Finch, the latter of whom was involved with Thomasville Furniture Industries and politics. Chapel services are held every Thursday.

The J.A. Jones Library is the bibliographic heart of the college community. Named after James Addison Jones, it houses the college's library collections. The building is also home to the Levy-Loewenstein Holocaust Collection, the First Citizens Bank Global Communications Center, and the Sternberger Cultural Center, the latter of which includes a 100-seat lecture hall.

The Cowan Humanities Building houses the offices of the Art and English/Communications, as well as a large lecture hall and several art galleries, including the Anne Rudd Gaylon Gallery, the Irene Cullis Gallery, and the LIFT Gallery. The building is also home to Middle College.

The Odell Memorial Building houses the offices of the performing arts departments, such as Theater and Music, and the 787-seat Huggins Performance Center. The building was built in 1922, but renovated in 1997 after a substantial donation from business leader Kenneth Lenon Huggins. The performance center is named after Huggins' wife, Gail.

Proctor Hall houses the offices of most academic departments while also containing classrooms and seminar rooms of various sizes. It consists of two buildings, an east and a west building. The Proctor Hall – East houses science laboratories and the offices of the Biology, Chemistry, Business, and Accounting Departments. Proctor Hall – West is where offices of other departments, such as the humanities and social sciences, are located. The Hall, first built in 1950, was named after Fred and Myrtle Proctor. The Proctors donated the funds necessary to renovate and update the halls in 1998.

Academics

Academic programs are organized across five different schools, the School of Arts, the School of Business, the School of Humanities, the School of Science and Mathematics, and the School of Social Sciences and Education. Greensboro College offers four undergraduate degrees – Bachelor of Arts, Bachelor of Business Administration, Bachelor of Music, and Bachelor of Science – across 35 undergraduate majors and 26 minors. The academic calendar consists of two semesters and a summer-school session. Full-time undergraduates must carry a minimum academic load of 12 credit hours per semester.

Additionally, the college offers five graduate degrees (masters-level):
 Master's of Education in Birth-Kindergarten Education; Elementary Education; or Special Education/General Curriculum
 Master's of Arts in Teaching English to Speakers of Other Languages (TESOL).
 Master's of Arts in Theology, Ethics, and Culture.

Honors program and academic honor societies
The George Center for Honors Studies welcomes accepted students whose high school GPA is at least 3.65 and whose SAT score is at least 1240 or ACT Composite score is at least 26. They are interviewed prior to being determined for suitability for the program. Honors students are privy to certain courses that are team-taught by two professors and must complete a thesis to graduate. The student committee of the program also organizes extracurricular activities and outings for Honors students. The Honors Program is housed in the Honors House, just north of the Cowan Humanities Building.

Greensboro College also has local chapters of the following national honor societies:
 Alpha Chi, a national honor society recognizing superior academic achievement
 Alpha Kappa Delta, national sociology honor society
 Beta Beta Beta, national biology honor society
 Delta Mu Delta, international business honor society
 Kappa Delta Pi, international education honor society
 Phi Alpha Theta, national history honor society
 Pi Delta Phi, international French honor society
 Pi Sigma Alpha, national political science honor society
 Psi Chi, national psychology honor society
 Sigma Delta Pi, national Spanish honor society
 Sigma Tau Delta, international English honor society
 Theta Alpha Kappa, national religion honor society

Athletics

The Pride's athletic program competes in the NCAA's Division III and the USA South Athletic Conference. It offers 17 intercollegiate sports.  Men's sports include baseball, basketball, football, golf, lacrosse, soccer, swimming, wrestling and tennis. Women's sports include basketball, golf, lacrosse, soccer, softball, swimming, tennis and volleyball.

The men's golf team has twice won the Division III national championship, in 2000 and 2011.

The men's soccer team was NCAA Division III runner-up in 1989 when they lost 2–0 to Elizabethtown College. Women's soccer saw one of their own players, Mercedes Bauzá, chosen to play for the Puerto Rico women's national football team in 2018.

As of the beginning of the 2011–2012 school year, 77 Pride student-athletes had been named All-Americans and 26 had been named Academic All-Americans.

Middle College

Greensboro College Middle College (GMC) is a high school program on the campus of Greensboro College located in Greensboro, North Carolina. It schools the 11th and 12th grades, and allows students to finish their high school career while earning college credit. GMC's main focus is to provide a more flexible learning environment for students previously unsuccessful or dissatisfied with traditional high school. As of the 2011–2012 school year, there are about 120 students enrolled.

Notable alumni
 Sallie Southall Cotten 1863, writer and clubwoman
 Eileen Fulton '55, soap opera and Broadway actress
 Carolyn Maloney '68, current U.S. Representative (D-NY) and chairwoman of the United States House Committee on Oversight and Reform
 Ryan Nelsen, professional soccer player and coach (attended)
 Sarah Dessen, novelist (attended)
 R. Carter Pate '76, chairman of the board of Red Lion Hotels Corporation and former CEO of MV Transportation
 Frederick A. Davie, '78, executive vice president at Union Theological Seminary and chairman of the New York City Civilian Complaint Review Board
 Stephanie Paulsell '85, Susan Shallcross Swartz Professor of the Practice of Christian Studies at Harvard Divinity School and interim Pusey Minister of the Memorial Church of Harvard University
 Dr. Jeremy Kinney '94, curator, Smithsonian National Air and Space Museum
 Heather Macy '00, basketball coach
 Jon Hardister '06, North Carolina House of Representatives Majority Whip
 Mercedes Bauzá '19, soccer player for Puerto Rico Sol FC and the Puerto Rico women's national football team
Sarah Lowe Twiggs (1839-1920), poet

Gallery

Notes

External links

 Official website
 Official athletics website
 Greensboro College student yearbooks on DigitalNC.org

 
Former women's universities and colleges in the United States
Private universities and colleges in North Carolina
Universities and colleges in Greensboro, North Carolina
Educational institutions established in 1838
Universities and colleges accredited by the Southern Association of Colleges and Schools
1838 establishments in North Carolina